A commonwealth is a traditional English term for a political community founded for the common good. Historically, it has been synonymous with "republic". The noun "commonwealth", meaning "public welfare, general good or advantage", dates from the 15th century. Originally a phrase (the common-wealth or the common wealth – echoed in the modern synonym "public wealth"), it comes from the old meaning of "wealth", which is "well-being", and is itself a loose translation of the Latin res publica (republic). The term literally meant "common well-being". In the 17th century, the definition of "commonwealth" expanded from its original sense of "public welfare" or "commonweal" to mean "a state in which the supreme power is vested in the people; a republic or democratic state".

The term evolved to become a title to a number of political entities. Three countries – Australia, the Bahamas, and Dominica – have the official title "Commonwealth", as do four U.S. states and two U.S. territories. Since the early 20th century, the term has been used to name some fraternal associations of states, most notably the Commonwealth of Nations, an organisation primarily of former territories of the British Empire. The organisation is not to be confused with the realms of the Commonwealth.

Historical use

Rome

Translations of Ancient Roman writers' works to English have on occasion translated "Res publica", and variants thereof, to "the commonwealth", a term referring to the Roman state as a whole.

England

The Commonwealth of England was the official name of the political unit (de facto military rule in the name of parliamentary supremacy) that replaced the Kingdom of England (after the English Civil War) from 1649–53 and 1659–60, under the rule of Oliver Cromwell and his son and successor Richard. From 1653 to 1659, although still legally known as a Commonwealth, the republic, united with the former Kingdom of Scotland, operated under different institutions (at times as a de facto monarchy) and is known by historians as the Protectorate. In a British context, it is sometimes referred to as the "Old Commonwealth".

Iceland

The Icelandic Commonwealth or the Icelandic Free State was the state existing in Iceland between the establishment of the Althing in 930 and the pledge of fealty to the Norwegian king in 1262. It was initially established by a public consisting largely of recent immigrants from Norway who had fled the unification of that country under King Harald Fairhair.

Philippines

The Commonwealth of the Philippines was the administrative body that governed the Philippines from 1935 to 1946, aside from a period of exile in the Second World War from 1942 to 1945 when Japan occupied the country. It replaced the Insular Government, a United States territorial government, and was established by the Tydings–McDuffie Act.  The Commonwealth was designed as a transitional administration in preparation for the country's full achievement of independence, which was achieved in 1946. The Commonwealth of the Philippines was a founding member of the United Nations.

Poland–Lithuania

Republic is still an alternative translation of the traditional name Rzeczpospolita of the Polish–Lithuanian Commonwealth. Wincenty Kadłubek (Vincent Kadlubo, 1160–1223) used for the first time the original Latin term res publica in the context of Poland in his "Chronicles of the Kings and Princes of Poland". The name was used officially for the confederal union formed by Poland and Lithuania 1569–1795.

It is also often referred as "Nobles' Commonwealth" (1505–1795, i.e., before the union). In the contemporary political doctrine of the Polish–Lithuanian Commonwealth, "our state is a Republic (or Commonwealth) under the presidency of the King". The Commonwealth introduced a doctrine of religious tolerance called Warsaw Confederation, had its own parliament Sejm (although elections were restricted to nobility and elected kings, who were bound to certain contracts Pacta conventa from the beginning of the reign).

"A commonwealth of good counsaile" was the title of the 1607 English translation of the work of Wawrzyniec Grzymała Goślicki "De optimo senatore" that presented to English readers many of the ideas present in the political system of the Polish–Lithuanian Commonwealth.

Catalonia

Between 1914 and 1925, Catalonia was an autonomous region of Spain. Its government during that time was given the title mancomunidad (Catalan: mancomunitat), which is translated into English as "commonwealth". The Commonwealth of Catalonia had limited powers and was formed as a federation of the four Catalan provinces. A number of Catalan-language institutions were created during its existence.

Liberia

Between 1838 and 1847, Liberia was officially known as the "Commonwealth of Liberia". It changed its name to the "Republic of Liberia" when it declared independence (and adopted a new constitution) in 1847.

Current use

Australia

"Commonwealth" was first proposed as a term for a federation of the six Australian crown colonies at the 1891 constitutional convention in Sydney. Its adoption was initially controversial, as it was associated by some with the republicanism of Oliver Cromwell (see above), but it was retained in all subsequent drafts of the constitution. The term was finally incorporated into law in the Commonwealth of Australia Constitution Act 1900, which established the federation. Australia operates under a federal system, in which power is divided between the federal (national) government and the state governments (the successors of the six colonies). So, in an Australian context, the term "Commonwealth" (capitalised), which is often abbreviated to Cth, refers to the federal government, and "Commonwealth of Australia" is the official name of the country.

The Bahamas

The Bahamas, a Commonwealth realm, has used the official style Commonwealth of The Bahamas since its independence in 1973.

Dominica

The small Caribbean republic of Dominica has used the official style Commonwealth of Dominica since 1978.

Certain U.S. states and territories

States

Four states of the United States of America officially designate themselves as "commonwealths". All four were part of Great Britain's possessions along the Atlantic coast of North America prior to the American Revolution. As such, they share a strong influence of English common law in some of their laws and institutions. The four are:
Kentucky is designated a commonwealth by the Kentucky Constitution as the "Commonwealth of Kentucky".
Massachusetts is a commonwealth, declaring itself as such in its constitution, which states: "[T]he body politic is formed by a voluntary association of individuals: it is a social compact, by which the whole people covenants with each citizen, and each citizen with the whole people, that all shall be governed by certain laws for the common good."
Pennsylvania uses the "Commonwealth of Pennsylvania" constitutionally and in its official title.
Virginia has been known as the "Commonwealth of Virginia" since before the American Revolutionary War, and is referred to as a commonwealth in its constitution.

Territories

Two organized but unincorporated U.S. territories are called commonwealths. The two are:
Commonwealth of Puerto Rico, since 1952
Commonwealth of the Northern Mariana Islands, since 1978

In 2016, the Washington, D.C. city council also selected "Douglass Commonwealth" as the potential name of State of Washington, D.C., following the 2016 statehood referendum, at least partially in order to retain the initials "D.C." as the state's abbreviation.

International bodies

Commonwealth of Nations

The Commonwealth of Nations—formerly the British Commonwealth—is a voluntary association of 54 independent sovereign states, most of which were once part of the British Empire. The Commonwealth's membership includes both republics and monarchies. The Head of the Commonwealth was Queen Elizabeth II, who also reigned as monarch directly in the 16 member states known as Commonwealth realms until her death in 2022.

Commonwealth of Independent States

The Commonwealth of Independent States (CIS) is a loose alliance or confederation consisting of nine of the 15 former Soviet Republics, the exceptions being Turkmenistan (a CIS associate member), Lithuania, Latvia, Estonia, Ukraine, and Georgia. Georgia left the CIS in August 2008 following the 2008 invasion of the Russian military into South Ossetia and Abkhazia. Its creation signalled the dissolution of the Soviet Union, its purpose being to "allow a civilised divorce" between the Soviet Republics. The CIS has developed as a forum by which the member-states can co-operate in economics, defence, and foreign policy.

Proposed use

United Kingdom

Labour MP Tony Benn sponsored a Commonwealth of Britain Bill several times between 1991 and 2001, intended to abolish the monarchy and establish a British republic. It never reached second reading.

See also

 Confederation
 Democracy
 Federation
 League

References

External links

 Commonwealth of Nations
 The Commonwealth—UK government site
 Commonwealth of Nations Secretariat
 Commonwealth Foundation
 Royal Commonwealth Society
 Commonwealth of Independent States
 CIS Executive Committee
 CIS Statistical Committee
 Countries
 Commonwealth of Australia
 United States
 Commonwealth of Kentucky
 Commonwealth of Massachusetts
 Commonwealth of Pennsylvania
 Commonwealth of Virginia
 Commonwealth of Puerto Rico
 Commonwealth of the Northern Mariana Islands
 Polish-Lithuanian Commonwealth
 Commonwealth of Diverse Cultures: Poland's Heritage
Commonwealth New
The Commonwealth Secretariat 
Commonwealth News at YOCOMM NEWS

15th-century neologisms
Democracy